|}

The Star  Stakes is a Listed flat horse race in Great Britain open to fillies aged two years only.
It is run at Sandown Park over a distance of 7 furlongs (1,408 metres), and it is scheduled to take place each year in July.

The race was originally known as the Milcars Fillies' Stakes.  It was given its current name and awarded Listed status in 1994.

Records
Leading jockey since 1988 (4 wins):
 Frankie Dettori - Fairy Queen (1998), On Her Toes (2016), Walk In Marrakesh (2019), Inspiral (2021)

Leading trainer since 1988 (6 wins):
 John Dunlop – Subya (1994), Tamnia (1995), Silver Jorden (2000), Sudoor (2006), Muthabara  (2007), Mudaaraah (2009)

Winners since 1988

See also
 Horse racing in Great Britain
 List of British flat horse races

References
Racing Post:

Flat races in Great Britain
Sandown Park Racecourse
Flat horse races for two-year-old fillies